The 1920 Nelson and Colne by-election was held on 17 June 1920 after the resignation of the incumbent Labour MP, Albert Smith.  It was retained by the Labour candidate Robinson Graham.

Result

References

Nelson and Colne 1920
Borough of Pendle
June 1920 events
1920 elections in the United Kingdom
1920 in England
1920s in Lancashire